Adolphus Frederick "Dolly" Williamson (1830 – 9 December 1889) was the first head of the Detective Branch of the Metropolitan Police and the first head of the Detective Branch's successor organisation, the Criminal Investigation Department (CID). He joined the force in 1850 and eventually became Chief Constable.

Williamson was buried in Brookwood Cemetery in Surrey.

In the television films The Suspicions of Mr Whicher (2011) and The Suspicions of Mr Whicher II (2013) he was played by William Beck.

In the Steampunk book series The Guild Chronicles by J.M. Bannon Williamson is used as a character.  The prequel to the series is titled [ "The Untold Tales of Dolly Williamson]" and is a fictional story of the detective's involvement in solving a crime with a supernatural killer.

References

Metropolitan Police chief officers
1830 births
1889 deaths
Burials at Brookwood Cemetery